The Stone Warehouse in Casa Grande, Arizona was built in 1922 by stonemason Michael Sullivan.  It was listed on the National Register of Historic Places in 1985.

It is a single-story rectangular building made of field stone, with a corrugated metal hipped roof.  It served as warehouse and cooler for the Pioneer Meat Market.  Its Arizona historic property inventory states: "The building's most unusual feature is a metal roof covered with three feet of dirt and topped with another metal roof. It was reportedly the coolest warehouse in town."

References

External links
 

Warehouses in the United States
National Register of Historic Places in Pinal County, Arizona
Commercial buildings completed in 1922
Buildings and structures in Casa Grande, Arizona
1922 establishments in Arizona